Luigi R. Marano (July 7, 1921 – December 29, 2017) was an American politician who served in the New York State Assembly from Kings's 12th district from 1957 to 1964.

He died on December 29, 2017, in Brooklyn, New York City, New York at age 96.

References

1921 births
2017 deaths
Republican Party members of the New York State Assembly